C.a.R.– Compass and Ruler (also known as Z.u.L., which stands for the German "Zirkel und Lineal") — is a free and open source interactive geometry app that can do geometrical constructions in Euclidean and non-Euclidean geometry.
The software is Java based.
The author is René Grothmann of the Catholic University of Eichstätt-Ingolstadt.
It is licensed under the terms of the GNU General Public License (GPL).

Assignments

Assignments make possible to create Java applets, for a construction exercises.
These applets can be used from the command line using the AppletViewer.
(Previously, they could be run in a browser, but Java support in browsers has been disabled in recent years.)

See also

 Graphmatica
 GeoGebra
 CaRMetal
 Compass-and-straightedge construction

External links
C.a.R.
 History of the C.a.R.

Free educational software
Free interactive geometry software
Java platform software